Sosnovy Bor is a rural locality (a selo) and the administrative center of Sosnovorovsky Selsoviet of Zeysky District, Amur Oblast, Russia. The population was 761 as of 2018. There are 19 streets.

Geography 
Sosnovy Bor is located 8 km southwest of Zeya (the district's administrative centre) by road. Zeya is the nearest rural locality.

References 

Rural localities in Zeysky District